Shorea maxwelliana is a species of plant in the family Dipterocarpaceae. It is a tree found in Sumatra and Peninsular Malaysia. It is threatened by habitat loss.

References

maxwelliana
Trees of Sumatra
Trees of Peninsular Malaysia
Endangered plants
Taxonomy articles created by Polbot